Carboxydocella thermautotrophica is an anaerobic, CO-utilizing thermophile bacterium. It is Gram-positive bacterium, its cells being short, straight, motile rods; its type strain is 41(T) (= DSM 12356(T) = VKM B-2282(T)).

References

Further reading
Sneath, Peter HA, et al. Bergey's manual of systematic bacteriology. Volume 3. Williams & Wilkins, 2012.
Satyanarayana, Tulasi, Jennifer Littlechild, and Yutaka Kawarabayasi. "Thermophilic Microbes in Environmental and Industrial Biotechnology."

External links 

LPSN
Type strain of Carboxydocella thermautotrophica at BacDive -  the Bacterial Diversity Metadatabase

Eubacteriales
Bacteria described in 2002